The following is a list of football stadiums in Egypt, ordered by capacity. Currently all stadiums with a capacity of 5,000 or more are included, most large stadiums in Egypt are used for association football, with some also used for athletics and rugby union.

Current stadiums

Top 10 stadiums by capacity

See also
List of African stadiums by capacity
List of association football stadiums by capacity

References

 
Egypt
Football stadiums in Egypt